The 1863 Melbourne Cup was a two-mile handicap horse race which took place on Friday, 20 November 1863.

This year was the third running of the Melbourne Cup. Controversially, two-time defending winner Archer was not allowed to take his place in the race after his nomination arrived in Melbourne one day late. The nomination arrived on a public holiday in Melbourne: Separation or Succession day to celebrate Victoria separating from New South Wales. As a result, The Victoria Turf Club's offices were closed for the holiday and Archer's nomination was rejected for being "too late". Because of this, Sydney trainers boycotted the race leaving only horses trained by Melbourne trainers. The resulting seven horse field is the lowest in the race's history. Archer would have carried 11st 4 lb (71 kg). By contrast, the winner, Banker carried 5st 9 lb (33.5 kg), the lightest weight carried by a winner and third place, Rose of Denmark carried 5st 12 lb (36 kg).

Rose Of Denmark was later disqualified as her jockey had not weighed in.

This is the list of placegetters for the 1863 Melbourne Cup.

See also

 Melbourne Cup
 List of Melbourne Cup winners
 Victoria Racing Club

References

External links
1863 Melbourne Cup footyjumpers.com

1863
Melbourne Cup
Melbourne Cup
19th century in Melbourne
1860s in Melbourne